Gaston IV (27 November 1422 – 25 or 28 July 1472) was the sovereign Viscount of Béarn and the Count of Foix and Bigorre in France from 1436 to 1472. He also held the viscounties of Marsan, Castelbon, Nébouzan, Villemeur and Lautrec and was, by virtue of the county of Foix, co-prince of Andorra. From 1447 he was also Viscount of Narbonne. Through his marriage to Eleonor, heiress of the Kingdom of Navarre, he also held the title of Prince of Navarre.

He was a son of John I, Count of Foix and Jeanne d'Albret. His maternal grandparents were Charles d'Albret, Constable of France and co-commander of the French army, killed at the Battle of Agincourt, and his wife Marie de Sully.

Gaston married the Navarrese Infanta, Eleonor, in 1436. Her parents were John II of Aragon and Blanche I of Navarre. At the time, Leonor appeared to have few prospects: her father was a younger son and brother of kings of Aragon, and Leonor had a brother, Charles of Viana, and an older sister, Blanca, standing between herself and the throne of Navarre. However, family dissent and death eliminated both Charles and Blanca; Leonor's father usurped the Navarrese crown, to which he added in 1458 the throne of Aragon (his older brother having died without legitimate children) and, following the deaths of Charles and Blanca, promised the succession to Navarre to Leonor and her husband in return for their loyalty to him, which was given.

Children 
 Gaston de Foix (1443–1470), (sometimes called “Gaston V of Foix”), Viscount of Castelbon, Prince of Viana (1462–1470), lieutenant general of Navarre (1469).
 Jean de Foix (1446–1500), Viscount of Narbonne (1468–1500), Count d'Étampes (1478–1500). He claimed the throne of Navarre upon the death of his nephew François Phébus. He married in 1476 Marie of Orleans (1457–1493), sister of the future King of France Louis XII.
 Marguerite de Foix (1449–1486), married at Clisson on 27 June 1471 Francis II, Duke of Brittany. They were parents of Anne of Brittany, twice queen of France as consort to both Charles VIII and Louis XII.
 Pierre de Foix (7 February 1449 – 10 August 1490), (sometimes called “Pierre II of Foix”), called Pierre the Young, cardinal (1576), viceroy of Navarre (1479–1484) 
 Marie de Foix (c. 1452–1467), married Guglielmo VIII, Marquis of Montferrat, son of Giangiacomo of Montferrat and his wife Jeanne de Savoie
 Jeanne de Foix (c. 1454 – c. 1476), married in August 1469 in Lectoure, to Jean V of Armagnac (1420-1473).
 Catherine de Foix (c. 1460 – before 1494), married in 1469 Gaston de Foix, Count of Candale (c. 1440–1500), (sometimes called “Gaston II of Foix”).
 Isabel de Foix (after 1462). 
 Leonor de Foix (after 1466 – died young). 
 Jacques de Foix, Infante de Navarra (1469 – in France 1500), Count de Montfort.  Married in 1485 and divorced in 1494 Ana de Peralta, daughter of Pedro de Peralta, 1st Count de Santisteban y Lerín and his second wife Isabelle de Grailly. Married secondly in 1495 Catherine de Beaumont, daughter of Louis de Beaumont, 2nd Count de Lerín and his wife Leonor de Aragón. Jacques and his second wife had one child: Jean de Foix, abbot of Saint-Volusien-de-Foix. Jacques also had two illegitimate children by unknown mistresses: Frederic de Foix (d. 1537), Seigneur d'Almenèches, and Jacques de Foix (d. 7 Apr 1535), Bishop of Oloron and Lescar.

Ancestry

References

Sources

Further reading
Courteault, Henri. Gaston IV, Comte de Foix, Vicomte souverain de Béarn, Prince de Navarre (1423–1472): Étude historique sur le Midi de la France et le Nord de l'Espagne au XVe siècle. Toulouse: Privat, 1895.

15th-century French nobility
15th-century Princes of Andorra
1422 births
1472 deaths
House of Foix
Counts of Foix
Viscounts of Béarn
Viscounts of Narbonne